Giovanni Bernardino Grandopoli (died 1590) was a Roman Catholic prelate who served as Bishop of Lettere-Gragnano (1576–1590).

Biography
On 19 September 1576, Giovanni Bernardino Grandopoli was appointed during the papacy of Pope Gregory XIII as Bishop of Lettere-Gragnano. 
On 4 November 1576, he was consecrated bishop by Giulio Antonio Santorio, Cardinal-Priest of San Bartolomeo all'Isola, with Cesare de' Giacomelli, Bishop of Belcastro, and Gaspare Viviani, Bishop of Hierapetra et Sitia, serving as co-consecrators. 
He served as Bishop of Lettere-Gragnano until his death in 1590. 
While bishop, he was the principal co-consecrator of Francesco D'Afflitto, Bishop of Scala (1583).

References

External links and additional sources
 (for Chronology of Bishops) 
 (for Chronology of Bishops)  

16th-century Italian Roman Catholic bishops
Bishops appointed by Pope Gregory XIII
1590 deaths